is a former Japanese football player.

Playing career
Saito was born in Fukushima Prefecture on April 7, 1973. After graduating from University of Tsukuba, he joined Japan Football League club Brummell Sendai (later Vegalta Sendai) in 1997. He became a regular player as right side back from first season. The club was promoted to J2 League from 1999. However his opportunity to play decreased from 2000 and he retired end of 2001 season.

Club statistics

References

External links

1973 births
Living people
University of Tsukuba alumni
Association football people from Fukushima Prefecture
Japanese footballers
J2 League players
Japan Football League (1992–1998) players
Vegalta Sendai players
Association football defenders